João Domingos da Silva Pinto (born 21 November 1961) is a Portuguese former footballer and manager. Having spent his entire professional career with Porto (16 years, winning a total of 24 major titles, including nine leagues and the 1987 European Cup), he is regarded as one of the greatest Portuguese right-backs of all-time.

Pinto represented the Portugal national team for more than one decade, appearing with them in one World Cup and one European Championship.

Playing career
Pinto was born in Oliveira do Douro, Vila Nova de Gaia, Porto District. A FC Porto trainee, it did not take him long to establish himself in the side's starting XI. When Fernando Gomes broke his leg before the 1986–87 European Cup final against FC Bayern Munich, he was picked as the captain, and reportedly only released the cup on Portuguese soil after the 2–1 win in Vienna.

Always an undisputed starter, Pinto retired after the 1996–97 season after 16 years as a professional, helping the northerners to their first three-leagues-in-a-row accolade (in total, he won nine national championships, four cups, and was part of the treble-winning squad which won the Champions Cup, the European Supercup and the Intercontinental Cup). Given his devotion and long service to the club, he was subsequently given a place coaching its youth teams.

Pinto totalled 70 caps with one goal for Portugal, being selected as captain on 42 occasions. After seeing the nation's 1994 FIFA World Cup qualification hopes squashed after a 0–1 away loss against Italy he left the field in tears, further enhancing his nickname, Capitão; he played internationally in UEFA Euro 1984 and at the 1986 World Cup – Bobby Robson, who coached Porto, once remarked of him: "He has two hearts and four legs. It's extremely difficult to find a player like him."

Coaching career
Pinto began working as a head coach in the Segunda Liga. He started with S.C. Covilhã, moving in January 2013 to G.D. Chaves and helping the latter club promote to that level in his only season.

Career statistics

Club
Appearances and goals by club, season and competition.

International
National team appearances and goals listed by year.

International goal
Scores and results list Portugal's goal tally first, score column indicates score after Pinto goal

Honours

Player
Porto
Primeira Divisão: 1984–85, 1985–86, 1987–88, 1989–90, 1991–92, 1992–93, 1994–95, 1995–96, 1996–97
Taça de Portugal: 1983–84, 1987–88, 1990–91, 1993–94
Supertaça Cândido de Oliveira: 1981, 1983, 1984, 1986, 1990, 1991, 1993, 1994
European Cup: 1986–87
European Super Cup: 1987
Intercontinental Cup: 1987

Individual
UEFA European Championship Team of the Tournament: 1984

Manager
Chaves
Segunda Divisão: 2012–13

See also
List of one-club men

References

External links

1961 births
Living people
Sportspeople from Vila Nova de Gaia
Portuguese footballers
Association football defenders
Primeira Liga players
FC Porto players
Portugal youth international footballers
Portugal under-21 international footballers
Portugal international footballers
UEFA Euro 1984 players
1986 FIFA World Cup players
Portuguese football managers
Liga Portugal 2 managers
S.C. Covilhã managers
G.D. Chaves managers